Cornelis Loosjes (Zaandam, 28 January 1723 - Haarlem, 5 January 1792) was a Dutch Mennonite teacher and minister. 

Cornelis was son of Adriaan Loosjes and Guurtje Klaasd. Visser, and the brother of Petrus Loosjes. First, he was Mennonite teacher and minister in Gouda during the years 1744-1751, after that from 1751-1763 he was minister of the Mennonites of the East side in Zaandam, but in 1763 he moved to the congregation in Haarlem in the Peuzelaarsteeg. Loosjes was founder of the magazine Vaderlandsche Letteroefeningen for which he wrote book reviews and was critical towards in his view exaggerated praise. He was friends with the Dutch writer Elisabeth Wolff who claimed he had a significant influence on her development.

References

1792 deaths
1723 births
Dutch Mennonites
Members of Teylers Eerste Genootschap
Mennonite ministers
Mennonite writers
People from Zaanstad
18th-century Anabaptist ministers